Miki Nakamura (born 12 September 1992) is a Japanese archer. She competed in the women's individual event at the 2020 Summer Olympics.

References

External links
 

1992 births
Living people
Japanese female archers
Olympic archers of Japan
Archers at the 2020 Summer Olympics
Sportspeople from Yamagata Prefecture
Nippon Sport Science University alumni
21st-century Japanese women